Ethyl May Halls (November 20, 1882 - September 16, 1967) was an American film and theatre actress for nearly 70 years. After being a Florodora girl she worked for Biograph Studios for several years in films with among others Mary Pickford and Rudolph Valentino. She appeared in many bit parts in Hollywood right up until the 1940s.

Halls was born in Canada and died September 16, 1967, in Hollywood, California.

References
Screen World Volume 19; Page 233

1967 deaths
1882 births
20th-century American actresses
Actresses from California
American film actresses
Place of birth missing